Weitchpec (  (Karuk: ansáfriik, Yurok: Wechpues, Wech,)  is an unincorporated community within the Yurok reservation in Humboldt County, California, United States. The ZIP Code is 95546.

Weitchpec is located in the northwestern part of the state at the confluence of the Klamath and Trinity Rivers, and the junction of State Highways 96 and 169.

History

Weitchpec was originally the site of a Yurok village and gives its name to one of seven districts of the Yurok Tribe, including all ancestral lands located upriver of Coon Creek on the Klamath River. Included within the District are the ancestral villages of Otsepor, Lo'olego, Weitspus, Pekwututl, Ertlerger, Wahsekw, Kenek, Tsetskwi, and Kenekpul.

Temporary names in the 19th century were Durkee's Ferry and Weitchpec Bar) Durkee's Ferry recalls Clark W. Durkee, who operated a ferry at the place in 1851. In 1855, a temporary Federal post called Camp Strowbridge was established at Weitchpec, it was later called Fort Wool. The settlement was first within the bounds of Trinity County, then in 1851 Klamath County and after 1874, Humboldt County. A post office operated at Weitchpec from 1858 to 1860 and from 1891 to 1962.

Today Weitchpec features a small store/gas station owned by the tribe (formerly Pierson's Grocery); the Yurok Tribal Office and Community Center; and Weitchpec Elementary School. As of 2010, evening classes were available in Weitchpec in the Yurok language.

2012 earthquake
A 5.6 earthquake with an epicenter near Weitchpec occurred on February 13, 2012.

See also

References

Unincorporated communities in Humboldt County, California
Yurok villages
Former Native American populated places in California
Klamath River
Settlements formerly in Klamath County, California
Unincorporated communities in California